Albert Préjean (27 October 1894 in Paris – 1 November 1979 in Paris) was a French actor, primarily in film. He served in World War I, and was decorated with the Croix de Guerre and the Legion d'honneur. With Lysiane Rey, he was the father of Patrick Préjean, and grandfather of Laura Préjean.

Biography
Préjean shot his first five films with French director Henri Diamant-Berger between 1921 and 1923. The roles he played tended to embody the leading man for the people, generous and strong.  His most lasting fame stems from his work in the films of René Clair that transition from the silent to the sound eras.  These include most notably the farce Un Chapeau de Paille d'Italie (1928) and the musicalized melancomic Sous les toits de Paris (1930).  When German director G. W. Pabst directed the film version of the huge Brecht-Weill musical hit Die Dreigroschenoper in 1931, he simultaneously shot a French-language version (L'opéra de quat'sous) with a French lead cast.  Préjean was given the coveted lead role of the underworld kingpin Mackie Messer.

In 1929 he directed a medium-length film  L'Aventure de Luna-Park with Daniele Parola. In addition to acting he was also a popular singer in the 1930s. He sang songs like "La Valse to Dede Montmartre".

During World War II he continued to act in films. In March 1942, he joined a group of actors who at the invitation of the Germans visited film studios in Berlin. This was alongside French actors and actresses such as René Dary, Astor Junie, Viviane Romance, Suzy Delair and Danielle Darrieux.

He recollected his memories in a book published in 1979 with the help of his son, voice actor Patrick Préjean.

Selected filmography 
 Le Miracle des loups (1924)
 The Phantom of the Moulin Rouge (1925)
 The Crazy Ray (1925)
 The Imaginary Voyage (1926)
 The Italian Straw Hat (1928)
 Verdun: Visions of History (1929)
 Les Nouveaux Messieurs (1929)
 The Shark (1930)
 Under the Roofs of Paris (1930)
 L'Opéra de quat'sous (1931)
 Amourous Adventure (1932)
 A Son from America (1932)
 Madame Makes Her Exit (1932)
 Sailor's Song (1932)
 Honeymoon Trip (1933)
 Toto (1933)
 Volga in Flames (1934)
 The Crisis is Over (1934)
 Gold in the Street (1934)
 Princess Tam Tam (1935)
 Jenny (1936)
 The Alibi (1937)
 Mollenard (1938)
 Unknown of Monte Carlo (1939)
 Metropolitan (1939)
 Cristobal's Gold (1940) 
 Strange Suzy (1941)
 Caprices (1942)
Shop Girls of Paris (1943)
 Cecile Is Dead (1944)
 Majestic Hotel Cellars (1945)
 The Murderer is Not Guilty (1946)
 The Scarlet Bazaar (1947)
 The Bouquinquant Brothers (1947)
 Love and Desire (1951)
 A Missionary (1955)
 Bombs on Monte Carlo (1960)

References

1894 births
1979 deaths
Chevaliers of the Légion d'honneur
French male film actors
French male silent film actors
Recipients of the Croix de Guerre 1914–1918 (France)
People from Pantin
20th-century French male actors